Kimaam may refer to:
Yos Sudarso Island, Merauke Regency, Indonesia, also known as Kimaam
Kimaam, Merauke, a village in Kimaam District, Indonesia, and the main settlement on Yos Sudarso Island